IPES may refer to:

 Instituto de Pesquisas e Estudos Sociais, a Brazilian think tank of the 1960s
 Inverse photoemission spectroscopy
 Ipos, an Earl and powerful Prince of Hell in demonology
 Tabebuia, Ipê trees
 Lapacho, a medical tea
 Improved Proposed Encryption Standard